Pío Cabanillas Alonso (born 9 December 1958) is a Spanish politician who served as Spokesperson Minister of the Government from April 2000 to July 2002. He is the son of Pío Cabanillas Gallas.

References

1958 births
Living people
Complutense University of Madrid alumni
Government ministers of Spain
21st-century Spanish politicians
Independent politicians in Spain